Algibacter amylolyticus is a Gram-negative, rod-shaped and motile bacterium from the genus of Algibacter which has been isolated from intertidal sediments from the Sakhalin Island.

References

Flavobacteria
Bacteria described in 2015